Chevella Assembly constituency is a SC reserved constituency of Telangana Legislative Assembly, India. It is one of 14 constituencies in Ranga Reddy district. It is part of Chevella Lok Sabha constituency.

Kale Yadaiah is currently representing the constituency.

Mandals 
The Assembly Constituency presently comprises the following Mandals

MLA's

Shahabad Constituency
1962 The Constituency head-quarters was shifted from Shahabad to Chevella and renamed as Chevella assembly Constituency.
1957 (Seat-1): V.Ramarao
1957 (Seat-2): Konda Venkata Rangareddy

Hyderabad State
Shahabad Constituency
1951 Konda Venkata Rangareddy.

Election results

Telangana Legislative Assembly election, 2018

Telangana Legislative Assembly election, 2014

See also 
 List of constituencies of Telangana Legislative Assembly
 Chevella

References 

Assembly constituencies of Telangana
Ranga Reddy district